Tudorel-Valentin Mavrodineanu (born 3 July 1986 in Bucharest, Romania) is a  Romanian aerobic gymnast. He won seven world championships medals (four gold, one silver, and two bronze) and seven European medals (six gold and one bronze).

References

External links

1986 births
Living people
Gymnasts from Bucharest
Romanian aerobic gymnasts
Male aerobic gymnasts
Universiade medalists in gymnastics
Medalists at the Aerobic Gymnastics World Championships
Universiade silver medalists for Romania
Competitors at the 2009 World Games
World Games gold medalists
Medalists at the 2011 Summer Universiade
21st-century Romanian people